Boris Becker was the defending champion and won in the final 6–1, 3–6, 6–3 against Stefan Edberg.

Seeds

  Stefan Edberg (final)
  Pat Cash (third round)
  Jimmy Connors (third round)
  Boris Becker (champion)
  Amos Mansdorf (third round)
  Slobodan Živojinović (first round)
  David Pate (third round)
  John Fitzgerald (second round)
  Kevin Curren (quarterfinals)
  Christo van Rensburg (quarterfinals)
  Ramesh Krishnan (third round)
  Eric Jelen (quarterfinals)
  Guy Forget (semifinals)
  Kelly Evernden (first round)
  Johan Kriek (third round)
  Mark Woodforde (first round)

Draw

Finals

Top half

Section 1

Section 2

Bottom half

Section 3

Section 4

External links
 1988 Stella Artois Championships draw

Singles